University—Rosedale is a provincial electoral district in Toronto. It elects one member to the Legislative Assembly of Ontario. This riding was created in 2015.  The Ontario Legislative Building is located within this district.

Members of Provincial Parliament

Election results

2022 election

2018 Election

References

External links
Map of riding for 2018 election

Provincial electoral districts of Toronto